François Louis Joseph Watteau (18 August 1758, Lille – 1 December 1823, Lille), known like his father as the Watteau of Lille, was a French painter, active in his birthplace. He was the son of the painter Louis Joseph Watteau (1731–1798) and grandson of Noël Joseph Watteau (1689–1756) –  Noël was the brother of Jean-Antoine Watteau, the painter of "fêtes galantes". From 1808 to his death, he was deputy curator of the Palais des Beaux-Arts de Lille, which his father had helped to found.

Works
 The Procession in Lille in 1789, oil on canvas, Musée de l'Hospice Comtesse, Lille 
 1799, The siege of Beauvais in 1472, oil on canvas, Musée des Beaux-Arts, Valenciennes
 c. 1803, La Fête du Broquelet, oil on canvas, Musée de l'Hospice Comtesse, Lille

Bibliography
 Mabille de Poncheville.
 Claude-Gérard Marcus.
 Gaëtane Maës, Les Watteau de Lille, Paris, 1998.

External links
 François Watteau on Artcyclopedia

1758 births
1823 deaths
Artists from Lille
18th-century French painters
French male painters
19th-century French painters
19th-century French male artists
18th-century French male artists